Lance is an American brand of snack foods owned by the Snyder's-Lance company headquartered in Charlotte, North Carolina. As of 2018, Snyder's-Lance is owned by Campbell's.

Merger
On July 22, 2010, Lance announced that it would merge with Snyder's of Hanover. The resulting company, known as Snyder's-Lance Inc., would remain publicly traded under the LNCE symbol. Headquarters would remain in Charlotte. On December 2, Lance shareholders approved the deal that created the country's second largest snack food company.

Nabs
Many snack cracker products manufactured by Lance are commonly referred to as "nabs", a genericized trademark name for snack crackers that originated with a competitor, the Nabisco company. The term originated in 1924 when the National Biscuit Company (Nabisco) introduced a snack, put in a 5-cent sealed packet called "Peanut Sandwich Packet". They soon added a second, "Sorbetto Sandwich Packet". These packets allowed salesmen to sell to soda fountains, road stands, milk bars, lunch rooms, newsstands etc. Sales increased and in 1928 the company adopted and started to use the name NAB, which immediately won the approval of the public.

Products

Cracker and cookie sandwiches
ToastChee
Toasty
Malt
Whole Grain
Captain's Wafers
Nekot
Quick Starts
Various flavored nuts and seeds
Gold-n-Chees crackers
Various flavored popcorns

References

External links

 

Food and drink companies established in 1913
Companies based in Charlotte, North Carolina
Snack food manufacturers of the United States

1913 establishments in North Carolina
2010 mergers and acquisitions